C. gallica may refer to:
 Clonopsis gallica a stick insect species found in France
 Coriolopsis gallica, a fungus species found growing on decaying wood

See also 
 Gallica (disambiguation)